Lordswood is the name for a number of places in the United Kingdom.

 Lordswood, Devon
 Lordswood, Kent
 Lordswood, Southampton